Carlo Emery (25 October 1848, Naples – 11 May 1925) was an Italian entomologist. He is remembered for Emery's rule, which states that insect social parasites are often closely related to their hosts.

Early in his career Carlo Emery pursued a course in general medicine, and in 1872 narrowed his interests to ophthalmology. In 1878 he was appointed Professor of Zoology at the University of Cagliari, remaining there for several years until 1881 when he took up an appointment at the University of Bologna as Professor of Zoology, remaining there for thirty-five years until his death. Emery specialised in Hymenoptera, but his early work was on Coleoptera. Prior to 1869, his earliest works were a textbook of general zoology and papers on fishes and molluscs. From 1869 to 1925 he devoted himself almost entirely to the study of ants.

Emery published extensively between 1869 and 1926 describing  130 genera and 1057  species mainly in Wytsman's  Genera Insectorum series.

Emery’s collections of Hymenoptera are in Museo Civico di Storia Naturale di Genova. His Coleoptera are in Museo Civico di Zoologia di Roma. He died at Bologna in 1925.

References

 Anonym 1925: [Emery, C.] Entomologist's Monthly Magazine (3) 61:209
 Conci, C. 1975: Repertorio delle biografie e bibliografie degli scrittori e cultori italiani di entomologia.  Mem. Soc. Ent. Ital. 48 1969(4) 904–905

External links

 List of Biographies/Portrait.
 Brief account and portrait.

Hymenopterists
1848 births
1925 deaths
19th-century Neapolitan people
Italian entomologists
Academic staff of the University of Cagliari